Kadavul Amaitha Medai is a 1979 Indian Tamil-language film directed by S. P. Muthuraman. The film stars Sivakumar and Sumithra. It was released on 7 September 1979. The film was a remake of Telugu film Devudu Chesina Pelli.

Plot 

Boopathi and Laxmi await the return of their son from town, who returns with Radha and tells them that he wants to marry her. His parents agree to the marriage, but soon problems arise.

Cast 
Sivakumar as the postman
Sumithra as two sisters
Major Sundarrajan
V. Gopalakrishnan as the doctor
Suruli Rajan
Vadivukkarasi

Soundtrack 
The soundtrack was compoised by Ilaiyaraaja, and lyrics were written by Vaali. The song "Mayile Mayile" is set in the Carnatic raga Hamsadhvani. It is the first time S. P. Balasubrahmanyam and Jency Anthony sang together. "Thendrale Nee Pesu" was the only song P. B. Sreenivas sang for Ilaiyaraaja in his life.

References

External links 
 

1970s Tamil-language films
1979 films
Films scored by Ilaiyaraaja
Films directed by S. P. Muthuraman
Tamil remakes of Telugu films